The desert warbler is a former bird species, which has now been divided into two species:
African desert warbler Sylvia deserti
Asian desert warbler Sylvia nana